France competed at the 2020 Winter Youth Olympics in Lausanne, Switzerland from 9 to 22 January 2020.

Medalists

Alpine skiing

Boys

Girls

Mixed

Biathlon

Boys

Girls

Mixed

Cross-country skiing

Boys

Girls

Curling

France qualified a mixed team of four athletes.
Mixed team

Mixed doubles

Figure skating

Six French figure skaters achieved quota places for France based on the results of the 2019 World Junior Figure Skating Championships.

Singles

Couples

Mixed NOC team trophy

Freestyle skiing 

Ski cross

Slopestyle & Big Air

Ice hockey

Nordic combined 

Individual

Nordic mixed team

Short track speed skating

Two French skaters achieved quota places for France based on the results of the 2019 World Junior Short Track Speed Skating Championships.

Boys

Girls

Ski jumping

Boys

Girls

Ski mountaineering

Individual

Sprint

Mixed

Snowboarding

Snowboard cross

See also
France at the 2020 Summer Olympics

References

2020 in French sport
Nations at the 2020 Winter Youth Olympics
France at the Youth Olympics